Respublikansky Stadion is a sports arena in Syktyvkar, Russia, which is used as the home ground for bandy club Stroitel, which plays in the Super League, first-tier of Russian professional bandy. The arena was inaugurated in 1971. The sports arena was reconstructed in 2021.

Sources

Bandy venues in Russia
Syktyvkar